= Fearson's floating cigarette =

Magic trick

Fearson's floating cigarette is a magical illusion created by Steve Fearson in the early 1990s.

== Effect ==
The performer displays a cigarette which behaves in almost a magnetic fashion, sticking to a fingertip, the tongue etc. Next it floats from hand to hand before suddenly dropping down near the floor. As it moves up again it passes through a ring formed by the performer's fingers, as proof that there is no external support, and ends up in the performer's mouth.

== History ==
Fearson had seen an illusion performed by John Kennedy, called the "Animated Self-lighting Cigarette". Fearson attempted to duplicate it, and thought that he had succeeded, but during a conversation with Kennedy he was told that he had, in fact, invented a new method. He published a manuscript to document the illusion, entitled "Fearson's floating cigarette", which included the necessary props.

== Method ==
The main principle is based on using a very thin thread, an old principle. But what Fearson had discovered during his attempts to duplicate John Kennedy's effect was a new and unorthodox way of arranging the thread. One end of the invisible thread is attached by wax to the cigarette and the other end is attached to the right thumb, with the middle of the invisible thread attached to the head, making it possible to create effects that previous to Fearson's discovery had been impossible, such as making the cigarette fall to the ground (performed by placing the right thumb near the head, causing the cigarette to fall down). This arrangement is now referred to as the "Fearson's Hookup", and has spawned many variations.

== Other variations ==
- Floating Glasses
- Lite Flite (with a small glowing ball)
- Floating Gum
